Constantino "Tino" Rábade Castiñeira (born March 14, 1956) is a Galician actor and playwright. He is also founding member of the Galician Writers Association and the Galician Ecologist Movement, a political party established in 1983.

Works
 Lenda antiga dun home que quererá voar (1979)
 A historia xamáis contada de Brancaneves e o Rei Artur (1998)

Awards
 I Prémio de Teatro Breve da Escola Dramática Galega
 Mención Honorífica no VIII Concurso Nacional de Teatro Infantil O Facho

References

External links
Biography in AELGA

1952 births
Living people
Spanish male writers